Francisco Joel Gerometta (born 1 September 1999) is an Argentine professional footballer who plays as a right-back for Unión de Santa Fe.

Professional career
Gerometta joined the youth academy of Unión Santa Fe in 2013. Gerometta made his professional debut with Unión Santa Fe in a 2-1 Argentine Primera División loss to River Plate on 10 February 2020.

On 13 July 2021, Gerometta moved to fellow league club Gimnasia La Plata on loan until the end of 2022, with a purchase option.

References

External links
 

1999 births
Living people
Argentine people of Italian descent
People from San Isidro, Buenos Aires
Argentine footballers
Association football defenders
Unión de Santa Fe footballers
Club de Gimnasia y Esgrima La Plata footballers
Argentine Primera División players
Sportspeople from Buenos Aires Province